Bilbao Orkestra Sinfonikoa (BOS) (Spanish: Orquesta Sinfónica de Bilbao, unofficial English translation: Bilbao Symphony Orchestra) is a symphony orchestra based in Bilbao, Basque Country.

History 

The orchestra's first concert was on May 8, 1922 at the Teatro Arriaga, under the direction of maestro Armand Marsick (nephew of Martin Pierre Marsick).

Principal conductors have been Armand Marsick, Vladimir Golschmann, Jesús Arámbarri, José Limantour, Antoine de Babier, Rafael Frühbeck de Burgos, Alberto Bolet, Pedro Pirfano, Urbano Ruiz Laorden and Theo Alcántara.  Günter Neuhold has been  music director and Chief Conductor since 2008.

It has also been conducted by Maurice Ravel, Jesús Guridi, Pablo Sorozábal, Krzysztof Penderecki, Carmelo Bernaola, Luis de Pablo, Ernesto and Cristóbal Halffter and other composers performing their own works.

The BOS was invited to perform at Mariinski Theatre in Saint Petersburg, Russia, for the 300th Anniversary of the city. In 1998 it represented the Basque Country at the World Expo in Lisbon, and in 1999 it took part in the inauguration of the Euskalduna Palace in Bilbao.

The BOS performs regularly at the National Auditorium in Madrid and the Musical Fortnight in Donostia, in addition to engagements at the Santander International Festival, Paris Festival, and the Religious Music Festival in Cuenca.

Recordings
In the 1980s, the era of López Cobos ("Obras de Arriaga") and Lorenzo Martínez Palomo ("Obras de Madina"), the BOS arranged its first most noteworthy recordings. At the end of the nineties an agreement was reached with the multi-national company NAXOS to record 30 CDs, and the results of these are now appearing.

Operas

Vocal, Choral and Orchestral Works

References

External links 
 

Basque music
Organisations based in Bilbao
Spanish orchestras
Musical groups established in 1922
Tourist attractions in Bilbao
1922 establishments in Spain